Robert Verdun (born 2 May 1911, date of death unknown) was a Belgian figure skater. He competed in the pairs event at the 1936 Winter Olympics.

References

External links
 

1911 births
Year of death missing
Belgian male pair skaters
Olympic figure skaters of Belgium
Figure skaters at the 1936 Winter Olympics
People from Tienen
Sportspeople from Flemish Brabant